Ken Konaka is a former international table tennis player from Japan.

Table tennis career
In 1964 he won several medals in team events in the Asian Table Tennis Championships.

He won four World Championship medals; two silver medals in the team event, one bronze medal in the doubles  with Keiichi Miki and another bronze in the mixed doubles with Naoko Fukatsu.

See also
 List of table tennis players
 List of World Table Tennis Championships medalists

References

Japanese male table tennis players
Asian Games medalists in table tennis
Table tennis players at the 1962 Asian Games
Asian Games gold medalists for Japan
Medalists at the 1962 Asian Games
Living people
Year of birth missing (living people)